Maine Museum of Innovation, Learning and Labor (Maine MILL) is located in the Bates Mill Historic District, in Lewiston, Androscoggin County, Maine.

Maine Museum of Innovation, Learning and Labor (Maine MILL) is a history and culture museum in downtown Lewiston, Maine.

Features
The museum features gallery exhibits, programming, and events that explore how life, labor, and culture shape the present and influence the future.  Located in Lewiston, Maine, with a  collection of salvaged manufacturing machinery and artefacts, archival photographs, and oral histories.

The Bates Mill Historic District is on the National Register of Historic Places.

See also

National Register of Historic Places listings in Androscoggin County, Maine

References

External links
Official Maine MILL website
Bates Mill History

Textile museums in the United States
Educational buildings in Lewiston, Maine
Industry museums in Maine
Museums in Androscoggin County, Maine
National Register of Historic Places in Lewiston, Maine
Tourist attractions in Lewiston, Maine